Helen Joyce "Joy" Hardon (5 September 1921 – 21 July 2016) was an Australian fencer. She competed in the women's individual foil event at the 1956 Summer Olympics.

References

1921 births
2016 deaths
Australian female foil fencers
Olympic fencers of Australia
Fencers at the 1956 Summer Olympics